The 180th Massachusetts General Court, consisting of the Massachusetts Senate and the Massachusetts House of Representatives, met in 1997 and 1998 during the governorships of Bill Weld and Paul Cellucci. Thomas F. Birmingham served as president of the Senate and Thomas M. Finneran served as speaker of the House.

Senators

Representatives

See also
 105th United States Congress
 List of Massachusetts General Courts

References

Further reading

External links
 
 
 
 
 

Political history of Massachusetts
Massachusetts legislative sessions
massachusetts
1997 in Massachusetts
massachusetts
1998 in Massachusetts